Don Leon is a 19th-century poem attributed to Lord Byron celebrating homosexual love and making a plea for tolerance. At the time of its writing, homosexuality and sodomy were capital crimes in Britain, and the nineteenth century saw many men hanged for indulging in homosexual acts.

It is not known who wrote it, although there are several theories.

The case for it being written directly from within the Shelley–Byron circle is increasingly gaining ground in the 21st century.

As it includes in its narrative and notes several incidents that happened after Lord Byron's 1824 death, it obviously could not have been written by him.

From internal dating, it was probably written in the 1830s.

It was published in 1866 by William Dugdale, who appears to have believed initially in the attribution to Byron as he attempted to use it to blackmail Byron's family.

It was reprinted in a Fortune Press limited edition in 1934 and immediately fell foul of the obscenity laws; the edition was seized and ordered destroyed, although several copies escaped the destruction and come up every so often on the rare book market. The 1934 edition was reprinted in facsimile by the Arno Press in 1975.

In 2017 Pagan Press published a new edition of Don Leon & Leon to Annabella. All surviving editions, from Dugdale to Fortune Press, were collated for the text. This is the first edition to include critical material in addition to the texts of the poems: a Foreword by editor John Lauritsen, essays by Louis Crompton and Hugh Hagius, correspondence between Joseph Wallfield and G. Wilson Knight, and a bibliography. The original notes to Don Leon contain many passages, some of them long, in Latin, Greek, German, French, and Italian; all of these have been translated into English.

The extended poem is well constructed and extremely well written, showing evidence of a classical education and knowledge of the processes of the House of Commons of the United Kingdom, as well as an intimate knowledge of the poet Lord Byron's life, including his youthful homosexual adventures on his travels 1809–11 and his romantic friendship with the beautiful choirboy John Edlestone whilst at University of Cambridge. This has led to the supposition that it may have been written by an intimate friend of Lord Byron's – however not by one who was concerned about his posthumous reputation. It was not common knowledge that the poet was what we would now call bisexual until the twentieth century.

References

 Louis Crompton, "Don Leon, Byron and homosexual law reform", in Literary visions of homosexuality (ed. Stuart Kellogg), Volume 6 of Research on homosexuality, Routledge, 1983, p. 53
 Steven Marcus, "The other Victorians: a study of sexuality and pornography in mid-nineteenth-century England", Transaction Publishers, 2008, p. 76
G.Wilson Knight, Lord Byron’s Marriage: The Evidence of Asterisks (Routledge 1957), pp. 159–201
Doris Langley Moore, The Late Lord Byron (John Murray 1961, rpt. 1976
Doris Langley Moore, Lord Byron Accounts Rendered (John Murray, 1974),

External links
 LORD BYRON (1788-1824): Don Leon (c. 1823-36)
 DON LEON Edited by Peter Cochran
 Byron's Boyfriends
 Pagan Press page on Don Leon

1830s poems
1866 poems
Censored books
English poems
LGBT literature in the United Kingdom
LGBT poetry
Lord Byron
Male homosexuality
Obscenity controversies in literature
Works of uncertain authorship